Jessica Harrison (born 27 October 1977) is a British-born French triathlete. She competed at the 2008 and 2012 Summer Olympics.

She is openly lesbian and in 2005 began a relationship with fellow French triathlete Carole Péon.

Harrison announced that she was retiring from international competition after the Grand Final of the 2013 ITU World Triathlon Series held in London on 14 September. However, she returned to competition for the 2014 Abu Dhabi International Triathlon where she finished fifth in the short distance race.

References

External links
 

1977 births
Living people
French female triathletes
French LGBT sportspeople
Olympic triathletes of France
Triathletes at the 2008 Summer Olympics
Triathletes at the 2012 Summer Olympics
Sportspeople from Sheffield
Lesbian sportswomen
LGBT triathletes